Sir George Trevor Holdsworth  (29 May 1927 – 28 September 2010) was the former chairman of National Power and of the Bradford-based Allied Colloids international chemical business. From 1992 until 1997 he was chancellor of the University of Bradford.

Early life
He was born in Bradford and attended Hanson Boys' Grammar School and Keighley Boys' Grammar School (Oakbank School, Keighley since 1967). He was a chorister at Bradford Cathedral. In his National Service, he was a pianist for the British Forces' Network in Hamburg.

Later in 1985, played the Grieg Piano Concerto with the Royal Philharmonic Orchestra (RPO) with Norbert Balatsch at the Royal Festival Hall in a charity concert. He also played duets with Stephen Hough, and performed at Southwark Cathedral.

Career
From 1952 to 1963 he worked for Bowater Paper (since 1994 called Rexam).

GKN
He joined the engineering conglomerate GKN. He was chairman from 1980 to 1988.

He was later the chairman of the Confederation of British Industry. He was chairman from 1983 to 1996 of Allied Colloids, and National Power from 1990 to 1995, and British Satellite Broadcasting (now called Sky UK since November 2018) from 1987 to 1990.

Personal life
He received a knighthood in the 1982 New Year Honours, and the CVO in the 1997 New Year Honours. He married Patricia Ridler in 1951, who was a violinist and actress, having three sons; she died in 1993. He married Jenny Watson in 1995. He died aged 83 in September 2010.

References

External links
 Desert Island Discs

British media executives
Businesspeople awarded knighthoods
Businesspeople in electricity
English chief executives
Chancellors of the University of Bradford
Commanders of the Royal Victorian Order
English pianists
Knights Bachelor
Businesspeople from Bradford
1927 births
2010 deaths
20th-century English businesspeople